Olga Ahtinen (born 15 August 1997) is a Finnish footballer who plays as a midfielder and has appeared for the Finland women's national team.

Career
Ahtinen was capped by the Finland national team in 2017, and she appeared for the team during the 2019 FIFA Women's World Cup qualifying cycle. She played for Finland at the UEFA Women's Euro 2022 and was approaching 50 international appearances. Domestically, she played for GBK Kokkola, before joining Swedish side Linköpings FC.

International goals

References

External links
 
 
 

1997 births
Living people
Finnish women's footballers
Finland women's international footballers
Women's association football midfielders
Damallsvenskan players
IF Limhamn Bunkeflo players
Brøndby IF (women) players
Kokkola Futis 10 players
Pallokissat players
Expatriate women's footballers in Denmark
Expatriate women's footballers in Sweden
Finnish expatriate footballers
Finnish expatriate sportspeople in Denmark
Finnish expatriate sportspeople in Sweden
People from Kokkola
Sportspeople from Central Ostrobothnia
UEFA Women's Euro 2022 players